Orizari (Bulgarian and Macedonian: Оризари) may refer to:

Antarctica
 Orizari Glacier

Bulgaria
 , village in Rodopi Municipality, Plovdiv Province
 , village in Tvarditsa Municipality, Sliven Province

Greece
 Rizari, village in Edessa Municipality; formerly named Oryzarion (Greek: Ορυζάριον,  Oryzárion), written Orizari (Cyrillic: Оризари) in some foreign languages today

North Macedonia
 Orizari, Gjorče Petrov, town in Gjorče Petrov Municipality
 Orizari, Kočani, village in Kočani Municipality
 Orizari, Lipkovo, village in Lipkovo Municipality
 Orizari Municipality, former municipality

See also 
 Dolno Orizari (disambiguation) (Lower Orizari)
 Gorno Orizari (disambiguation) (Upper Orizari)
 Šuto Orizari, neighbourhood and seat of the Šuto Orizari Municipality, City of Skopje, North Macedonia
 Šuto Orizari Municipality, municipality in City of Skopje, North Macedonia